Waterman Building may refer to:

The Waterman Building (Chicago), a historic building on State Street in Chicago's Loop
The Waterman–Smith Building, a high-rise in Mobile, Alabama
The first permanent home for the Rhode Island School of Design in College Hill, Providence, Rhode Island